Rhodia was a group specialized in fine chemistry, synthetic fibers, and polymers.

The company was acquired by the Belgian Solvay group after a successful tender offer , completed in September 2011. The company served the consumer goods, automotive, energy, manufacturing, and processes and electronics markets, and had 65 production sites worldwide, four research centers, and four joint laboratories.

History 
Rhodia was a public company that was founded on January 1, 1998 following the spin-off of the chemicals, fibers, and polymers activities of Rhône-Poulenc when it merged with the German company Hoechst. On June 25, 1998, Rhône-Poulenc sold 32.7% of its share in Rhodia's capital to the public. Rhodia became a listed company. In 1999, Rhodia made two acquisitions:
 The Engineering Plastics activity of the top Korean group Hyosung, for Rhodia's Polyamides business unit.
 The Iberica Mix & Fix Center activity of Quimica Dos. The Mix & Fix Center is a unit that formulates and sells ready-to-use Hot Vulcanizable Silicone Elastomers.

From October 1999, Rhône-Poulenc, which became Aventis then Sanofi-Aventis, gradually reduced its stake in Rhodia's capital. It sold all its shares in the company on October 17, 2006.

Rhodia grew in the United Kingdom and the United States by buying out Albright and Wilson and ChiRex. In 2002 Rhodia sold off its basic chemicals activities in Europe (phenol, hydrochloric acid, sodium carbonate) and its holdings in Latexia (which was the world's number two for latex for paper) and Teris (treatment of toxic waste.
In 2004, Rhodia sold its food ingredients business. On March 31, 2004, Yves-René Nanot was appointed chairman of the board of directors.
In 2005, it sold the chlorine (in the United Kingdom), phosphates and sulfuric acid (in Belgium) activities.

In 2006, Rhodia sold its latex business, plus its synthesis activity, and its facilities for the production of industrial wires and fibers in Europe. 2006 saw the creation of Orbeo, a joint venture with Société Générale, in the field of origination, trade and sale of carbon credits. Orbeo represents 8% of the carbon market.

In 2007, Rhodia sold its silicones production activity and its Nylstar subsidiary (synthetic textile fiber) and acquired the alumina activity of WR Grace. In 2008, Rhodia sold its fine organic chemicals and pharmaceutical activities. On March 17, 2008, the board of directors appointed Jean-Pierre Clamadieu as the chairman and CEO of Rhodia. This appointment followed the resignation of Yves-René Nanot from his position as the chairman of the board of directors as a result of the statutory conditions applying to age limits.

In 2009, Rhodia acquired two companies: OneCarbon International and the McIntyre group (specialized surfactants, United States). In 2010, Rhodia acquired an 87% stake in the capital of Feixiang Chemicals. On January 1, 2011, Rhodia set up a new organization. Operational activities are now organized in 11 business units, in five sectors of activity: Consumer Chemicals, Advanced Materials, Polyamide Materials, Acetow & Eco Services and Energy Services. The additional Support Function Group includes corporate activities.

In the first quarter of 2011, the Belgian chemicals group Solvay launched a friendly public take-over bid for Rhodia. The operation was authorized by the boards of directors of both groups. On March 8, 2011, Rhodia announced the finalization of the acquisition of the Suzhou HiPro Polymers guar derivatives production plant in Zhangjiagang, China and on April 13, 2011, Rhodia completed the acquisition of the engineering plastics activity of the Indian company PI Industries Ltd (PIIL), following the approval of the Indian authorities.

In September 2011, Solvay's tender offer on Rhodia was successfully completed and Rhodia became a sector of the Solvay group.

Debt from Rhône-Poulenc 
After its breakaway from Rhône-Poulenc, Rhodia had to cope with the repercussions of soil pollution and financial liabilities. Prominent figures, such as Thierry Breton and the Swiss banker Édouard Stern, were involved in trying to work out solutions. The group's balance sheet-based structure remained fragile due to negative equity. On December 31, 1999, Rhodia's debt inherited from the split with Rhône-Poulenc amounted to €1,540 million.
In an attempt to solve the group's debt problem, management renegotiated a debt estimated at about €1 billion in 2010 (Rhodia's lowest debt level since the group was created ). Declared tangible investments in 2009 totaled €167 million, compared with €241 million in 2008.

Commitment to Sustainable Development 
In 2003, Rhodia set up a department dedicated to a Sustainable Development, a  continuation of the quality-safety-environment initiative set up by Rhône-Poulenc. In 2007, it rolled out the Rhodia Way®, the group's reference framework of responsibilities toward stakeholders. Group employees can use this reference system to self-assess the performance of their entity in terms of social and environmental responsibility, with the goal of encouraging more responsible practices.

In September 2010, Rhodia was recognized by the Dow Jones Sustainability Index (DJSI World) as one of the world's most efficient chemicals companies in terms of social and environmental responsibility for the third year in a row.

Rhodia has signed a number of agreements as part of this initiative:
 2002: commitment by the Group to cut its greenhouse gas emissions in France by 30% during the period between 1990 and 2010, as part of the French association of businesses for the reduction of greenhouse gases (AERES).
 2003 : Rhodia signs the United Nations Global Compact, to promote and enforce ten major principles in the realm of human rights, working conditions, environmental protection and the fight against corruption.
 2004: the group signs the diversity charter in France, which encourages businesses to guarantee the promotion of and respect for diversity in their workforce.
 2005: signed the worldwide social and environmental responsibility agreement with the ICEM (International Federation of Chemical, Energy, Mine and General Workers Unions).
 2006: signed the Responsible Care® Global Charter, a worldwide initiative of the International Council of Chemical Associations. The Global Charter of the Commitment to Progress has the goal of exceeding the principles of Responsible Care® in terms of health, safety and environmental performance. The key criteria of this charter include improved product stewardship, greater transparency for stakeholders, and the assessment and publication of environmental performance.
 2007: first audit mission to China to validate the proper application of the worldwide ICEM  agreement in the field.
 2008: renewal of the agreement with the ICEM for an additional three years, following the revision of the texts and the incorporation of the Rhodia Way® initiative. Second audit mission related to the ICEM agreement to Brazil.
 2009: Creation of a Worldwide Safety body as part of the worldwide ICEM agreement.
 2010: First assessment mission of the Worldwide Safety body to the United States. Fourth audit mission of the application of the agreement to South Korea.
 2011: Renewal of the agreement with the ICEM for an additional five years.

Group activities

Consumer Chemicals

Consumer Chemicals is made up of three business units: Novecare, Coatis and Aroma Performance, which mainly service the consumer markets. In 2010, Consumer Chemicals’ posted revenues of €1,883 million, representing 36% of the Rhodia Group's revenue.22Breakdown of revenue by market sector in 2010.
 <15% oil and gas,
 >10% agrochemicals,
 about 35% consumer goods,
 about 25% manufacturing and processing,
 about 15% construction and coatings.

Novecare

Novecare supplies high-performance chemicals to industries in the cosmetics, detergents, agrochemicals, coatings, oilfield and industrial applications sectors. The company has 15 production plants worldwide. Novecare acquired the activities of the US company  McIntyre, followed by the activities of Feixiang, China's leading producer of amines and surfactants in 2010. Consequently, Rhodia is now the leading producer of specialized surfactants in Asia.
With a turnover of €1,089 million in 2010, Novecare accounts for 58% of Consumer Chemicals’ revenue.

Coatis 
Coatis principally supplies the paint, surface coatings, automotive, wood and construction industries with  phenol, phenol derivatives and oxygenated solvents. The company has one production plant in Brazil and three technical development centers. With a turnover of €449 million in 2010, Coatis represents 24% of Consumer Chemicals’ revenue.

Aroma Performance 

As the world's leading producer of diphenols, Aroma Performance supplies aromas and fragrances. Key products include vanillin and ethylvanillin, but also hydroquinone or catechol. Aroma Performance is active worldwide on markets in Europe, Asia, South America and North America. The company has five manufacturing plants worldwide.
With a turnover of €345 million, Aroma Performance accounts for 18% of Consumer Chemicals revenue.

Advanced Material 

Advanced Materials services high-performance industries, including low energy-consumption tires, automotive catalysis and low-consumption lighting. Advanced Materials includes the Silica and Rare Earth Systems business units. In 2010 Advanced Materials posted turnover of €539 million, representing 10% of the Rhodia Group's revenue.
Breakdown of revenue by market sector in 2010:
 <15% consumer goods
 5% animal feed
 >60% automotive
 about 20% electronics.

Silica 

As the world's leading producer of highly dispersible silica, Silica services, first and foremost, the automotive industry in its quest to develop solutions that reduce energy consumption. Silica produces amorphous precipitated silica.  The silica is made from sodium silicate, which is in turn the fusion of sand and sodium carbonate at very high temperatures. Formed by a reaction with sulfuric acid, the silica is then filtered, washed and dried. Silica's products are produced in eight manufacturing plants worldwide. With turnover of €313 million in 2010, Silica accounts for 58% of Advanced Materials’ revenue.

Rare Earth Systems 

Rare Earth Systems supports the automotive, lighting and electronic industries in their development of solutions that produce fewer emissions, consume less energy and offer improved performance. The company separates  rare earths in a number of purification steps, to produce high added-value formulations that meet the needs of the automotive, lighting and electronics industries. Rare Earth Systems has six production plants worldwide. With turnover of €226 million in 2010, Rare Earth Systems represents 42% of Advanced Materials’ revenue.

Polyamide Materials 

Polyamide Materials groups together the polyamide chain of the Polyamide & Intermediates, Engineering Plastics and Fibras business units  and develops solutions for sustainable mobility. The automotive industry is one of their largest markets. With turnover of €1,701 million in 2010, Polyamide Materials represents 33% of the Rhodia Group's revenue.
Breakdown of revenue by market sector:
 <10% construction
 >10% manufacturing and process
 about 40% automotive
 about 30% consumer goods
 about 10% electrical and electronics.

Polyamide & Intermediates 

Polyamide & Intermediates produces polyamide 6.6 and intermediates based on adipic acid for the automotive industry, sports apparel, leisure activities, construction and electrical and electronic components. The entity covers the complete polyamide chain, from the production of intermediates and polymers to the development of high added-value technical plastics.
Polyamide & Intermediates has seven production plants and two technical development centers worldwide.

Engineering Plastics 

Engineering Plastics develops, produces and markets plastics under the Technyl brand. The plastics are supplied to the plastics industry in the shape of pellets. They are then transformed by injection, extrusion or blow molding techniques to service industries, including automotive, electrical or electronic components, industrial equipment, construction, sports and leisure. The company has six industrial facilities and four technical development centers worldwide. On April 13, 2011, Engineering Plastics finalized the acquisition of the engineering plastics activity of the Indian company PI Industries Ltd (PIIL), following the approval of the Indian authorities.

Fibras 

Fibras develops, produces and markets textile yarn, industrial yarn and short fibers based on polyamide 66. The main markets for textile yarns include lingerie, sports and beach wear and fashion wear. The company has two production plants and one development center in Brazil.

Acetow & Eco Services 
Acetow & Eco Services is active on the energy and consumer goods markets. The branch includes the Acetow and Eco Services business units. With turnover of €790 million in 2010, Acetow & Eco Services accounts for 15% of the Rhodia Group's revenue. Breakdown of revenue by market sector: about 65% consumer goods, about 20% energy and 15% others.

Acetow 

Acetow is the third largest producer of industrial textiles made of cellulose acetate particles. Its main markets are in Europe, the CIS, Asia and Latin America. Acetow is the world's third largest producer of cellulose acetate for cigarette filters, supplying about 18% of the worldwide market. The company has five production plants worldwide. With turnover of €539 million in 2010, Acetow represents 68% of the Acetow & Eco Services combined revenue.

Eco Services 

Eco Services is a service company that regenerates sulfuric acid  for the chemical industry and oil refineries in North America. Sulfuric acid is used as a catalyst in the production of alkylate, one of the fundamental components of high-octane index gasoline. The Eco Services network is made up of eight production units on seven different sites in California, Texas, Louisiana and Indiana. Two of them also provide chemical waste treatment services.

In 2010, Eco Services posted turnover of €251 million, which accounts for 32% of the Acetow & Eco Services activities’ revenue.

Energy Services

Energy Services is responsible for energy supplies and the management of Rhodia's projects to reduce greenhouse gas emissions. Energy management embraces the purchasing, production and sale of energy. In the field of purchasing, mainly of gas and electricity, Energy Services managed €630 million of energy purchases in 2009,68% of which was for Rhodia's own needs, while the remaining 32% was for third parties, notably for the Group's partners in its joint ventures.
In France, Rhodia is the second biggest industrial buyer of gas and one of the top ten purchasers of electricity.
Energy Services has invested in biogas technology by acquiring the Econcern group's share of six biogas production pilots in China and Vietnam.
With revenues of €203 million in 2010, Energy Services represents 4% of the Rhodia Group's turnover and operates four industrial plants in Brazil, China, France and Vietnam.
In 2010, Rhodia Energy Services developed its "Climate Care" solutions for the production of energy from renewable biological materials. Two biogas projects in China, Vietnam and the partnership between the private company Paraiso and Eco Services in Brazil have provided an opportunity to develop a biomass project based on bagasse.

Production sites

Rhodia has 65 production sites worldwide.

Worldwide distribution

Main production sites

Europe 

Rhodia has 22 production sites in Europe, including 10 in France.
The Rhodia Group is present in Germany (Freiburg), Italy (Ospiate), Poland, the Commonwealth of Independent States (CIS) (Sertow LLC), Spain and the United Kingdom.

La Rochelle 
According to ANDRA, the French agency for waste management,  until July 1994, Electronics and Catalysis (now Rhodia Rare Earth Systems) used very slightly radioactive monazite as an ore, producing radium-bearing waste, which was initially stored at ANDRA's La Manche center until 1991, then in the French atomic energy commission's Cadarache facility.
The treatment of the slightly radioactive monazite produced 8,023 tons, according to ANDRA  ), of slightly radioactive solid residue up until 1994. According to ANDRA, in 2007, this residue contained 2,000 tons of uranium and 2.6 tons of toxic lead.
The plant is subject to ICPE environmental surveillance.
A project to launch a recycling plant for the rare earth contained in used lightbulbs is being looked into.

Asia-Pacific
Rhodia currently includes a Rhodia-Asia-Pacific zone (CIS, Middle East and Africa), managed by Michel Ybert, with an operational head office in Shanghai. This zone has 21 production sites  and accounted for 29% of Rhodia's revenues in 2010.
The Asia-Pacific  support functions – finance, HR, purchasing and IT –are based in Singapore.
The Asia Pacific zone includes production activities in China, Japan, Thailand, India and Indonesia, plus commercial activities in China, Japan and Korea.

South America
The Rhodia Group has three production sites in Brazil and one in Venezuela.

North America
The Rhodia Group has 18 sites spread across the United States.

Former production sites

Rhodia opération SAS 
Located on the banks of the Deûle canal, near Lille in Northern France,  the ICPE chemical works was founded by Frédéric Kuhlmann, who started off with a small two hectare chemical factory that he bought in 1847. The factory then belonged to the Rhône-Poulenc Chemicals group, which became Rhodia. During a working lifetime of 150 years, the site grew from two  to 33 hectares, in the neighbourhoods of La Madeleine, Saint-André-lez-Lille and Marquette-lez-Lille.

Between 1961 and 2001, the site produced highly toxic Toluene diisocyanate (TDI), which is one of the basic components used to produce polyurethane foam.
Until December 2005, the tar produced by the synthesis of the TDI was incinerated on-site.

The group abandoned the site, and the last remaining remnants – the two 80-meter high smoke stacks built in 1929 and 1933 – were demolished. Until 2006, a store, a plant and a backup store of oleum remained on the site 3,000 m³ of earth from the old branch railway were stored on the site and part of the plot was bought by the FICHAUX coffee roasting company.

The after-effects 
Various studies, supervised by the French regional agency for industry and research, DRIRE, revealed serious pollution by heavy metals (zinc, copper and lead) almost everywhere on the site, plus mercury and cadmium in one area and nitrates, sulfates, ammonium and arsenic by the Deûle canal.
Certain pollutants had percolated into the soil and polluted the surface groundwater: potassium, sulfates, nitrates, nitrites, chlorides, ammonium and sodium, and locally, zinc and cadmium, to depths of up to 2 m in the so-called ANS sector, plus arsenic under the AS/PS sector and manganese under the GMG sector.
This groundwater rose when the industrial pumps were stopped and flooded the basements in nearby houses, requiring permanent pumping in order to drain the subsoil.
Severe pollution by arsenic was discovered up to depths of 5 meters in the AS/PS sector, plus mercury in the northeast half of this same sector.
The chalk layer under the site was contaminated by sulfates.
For these reasons, the local authorities deemed that the site was compatible with industrial usage, but with restrictions to be applied on a case-by-case basis with the potential buyers of the various parts of the site, on a long-term and mandatory basis for third parties through publication in the land registry. The Lille city authorities considered locating a purification plant on the site.
A number of projects for the industrial, urban or administrative use of the site are in progress. The position of the site in an area of designated as “green belt” on the banks of the Deûle, the pollution and its highly artificial character make it an important factor in the ecological fragmentation of the regional ‘’’blue infrastructure’’’.

Research and development

Research centers 

Rhodia has four research centers worldwide, which filed for 110 patents in 2009, 20% of which were filed by the teams in Asia and Latin America.

France : Aubervilliers (CRTA, Île-de-France) and Saint-Fons (CRTL, Lyon)
500 researchers currently work at the Lyon Research and Technology Center (CRTL). These laboratories specialize in materials, polymerization synthesis and processes, catalysis, physico-chemistry, process engineering and safety, the environment, analytical techniques, knowledge management and intellectual property. The site is actively involved in partnerships with universities in the Rhône-Alpes region, public and private research institutes and the Axelera center of excellence.
In 2010, the Technyl Innovation Center, the Group's new development center, which is part of the Lyon Research and Technology Center, was opened on the Rhodia site at Saint-Fons Belle-Etoile. The Technyl Innovation Center is home to a multidisciplinary and multicultural team of specialists.

United States : Bristol, Pennsylvania, United States (CRTB)
The Bristol center is home to a network of application laboratories dedicated to the Rhodia Group's main markets. These laboratories focus on consumer health, the pharmaceutical industry, household products, personal care, cosmetics, detergents and baby care products, phosphorus specialties and derivatives for water treatment products and fire retardants, petroleum technologies to improve the efficiency of oil extraction, and alumina technology for washcoats, an important component of catalytic converters, which complete Rhodia's rare earths range for automotive anti-pollution systems.

Brasil : Paulínia, Sao Paulo Brasil (CPP) 
The Paulinia center comprises application, synthesis, process and analysis laboratories for the development of new products and processes in association with Rhodia's customers. Almost 100 scientists work in these laboratories in the following fields: organic chemistry, polymerization, materials science and formulations for the paint, footwear, automotive and tire industries.

China : Shanghai, China (CRTS)
The Shanghai center is the Rhodia Group's main research center in Asia. Rhodia also has technical centers based in Singapore, Japan and Korea. They focus on the Asian markets for the automotive, electronics, home care and personal care sectors and on formulations for oil extraction and agriculture.

Joint laboratories 
Since 1980, Rhodia has been collaborating with researchers from the French National Scientific Research Center (CNRS).
The company has three joint research laboratories (CFL, LOF and LPMA), which bring together permanent researchers from the CNRS and Rhodia, plus PhD and post-PhD students. Rhodia also has young researchers from the CNRS (PhD and post-PhD) in its research and technology centers.

Complex Fluids Laboratory (CFL) in the Research and Technology Center in Bristol, Pennsylvania, United States
Created as a joint venture with the CNRS in 1996, this laboratory became a three-party venture in 2008, with the arrival of the University of Pennsylvania. The complex fluids laboratory is a joint, cross-functional entity, with a broad based physicochemical expertise in soft condensed matter, at the interface of chemistry, biology, physics and nanotechnology.
The team works on rheology, complex fluids and interface management.

The Laboratory of the Future (LOF) at the Pierre Gilles De Gennes Center, Pessac, France

In 2004, Rhodia created a Rhodia / CNRS joint laboratory in partnership with the University of Bordeaux 1.
The 20 researchers at the laboratory work on ways of improving research productivity and cutting the time to market of new products. The laboratory focuses on the development of miniaturized research tools and innovative projects in the realm of physico-chemistry.

The Advanced Polymers and Materials Laboratory (LPMA), Lyon Research and Technology Center, France
In 2006, a joint Rhodia / CNRS laboratory was set up in partnership with Axelera and the Claude Bernard University in Lyon. It brings together a team of physicists and rheologists specializing in polymers, specialists in theoretical modeling and applications for rubber and plastics. Their goal is to develop polymer materials with high thermal and mechanical resistance in order to better meet the challenges of safety and energy savings. Sustainable development criteria are taken into consideration for these materials right from the design phase.

The future joint laboratory, Shanghai, China
In 2010, Rhodia, the CNRS, the Lyon Ecole Normale Supérieure (ENSL) and the East China Normal University (ECNU) of Shanghai signed an agreement to extend their scientific collaboration in the field of green chemistry. In November  2011, the French National Center for Scientific Research (CNRS), Rhodia, the Ecole Normale Superieure of Lyon and the East China Normal University officially opened the Laboratory of Eco-efficient Products and Processes, an international joint research unit devoted to eco-friendly chemistry based in Shanghai (China).

The Rhodia Pierre-Gilles de Gennes award
In 2008, Rhodia created the Rhodia Pierre-Gilles de Gennes award for Science and Industry. This prize is awarded to projects of a very high scientific standard that make a significant contribution to chemistry, physics or physico-chemistry and impact international industry: a breakthrough innovation with a proven industrial development or technology transfer. The Award recognizes scientists who have:
 Created a durable innovative company
 Or developed an original and significant scientific or technological event that leads to new exchanges and research in the scientific community
The prize, which is worth a total of €200,000, is awarded every two years by a jury of renowned peers, including:
 Jean-Marie Lehn, Professor at Louis Pasteur University, Strasbourg. Nobel Prize Winner for Chemistry, 1987
 Claude Cohen-Tannoudji, Nobel Prize Winner for Physics, 1997
 Alan Heeger, Nobel Prize Winner for Chemistry, 2000
 Christian Amatore, director of research at the CNRS, Paris Ecole Nationale Supérieure
 Alain Fuchs, president of the CNRS, Professor at the Pierre et Marie Curie University, Paris
 Jacques Prost, director of the ESPCI (Higher School of Physics and Industrial Chemistry)
The candidates must be active scientists or members of academic institutions, universities or private laboratories who are nominated by their peers.

Prize winners 
 The 2008 Rhodia - Pierre-Gilles de Gennes Award for Science and Industry went to Professor Sir Richard Friend for his  discoveries in the field of electroluminescence and charge injections into semi-conductor polymers.
 The 2010 Rhodia Pierre-Gilles de Gennes Award for Science and Industry went to Avelino Corma, Professor at the  University of Valencia in Spain, for his work on heterogeneous catalysis.

Governance

Board of Directors
The Rhodia Board of Directors currently has 11 members. The articles of association require that no less than three and no more than 18 members sit on the board. Since 2005, members have been appointed for a period of four years. The regulations of the board of directors stipulate that non-executive members can remain on the board for a maximum of 12 years. Renewals are staggered over two consecutive years.

On November 31, the members of the board of directors were:

General management
On November 31, 2010, the members of the executive committee were:
 Gilles Auffret, chief executive officer
 Pascal Bouchiat, group executive vice-president and chief financial officer
 Pascal Juery, group executive vice-president
 Jean-Pierre Labroue, general counsel and corporate secretary

Previous Rhodia CEOs 
 1998 to 2003 : Jean-Pierre Tirouflet, chairman and chief executive officer  
 2003 to 2004 : Chairmanship vacant, Yves-René Nanot, vice-chairman  
 2004 to 2008 : Yves-René Nanot, chairman 
 2008 to 2011 : Jean-Pierre Clamadieu, chairman and chief executive officer.
 Since 2011 : Gilles Auffret, chief executive officer

Shareholders
Since the successful tender offer completed in 2011, Rhodia is now part of the Solvay group.

Key figures

Rhodia Group data

Breakdown by activity in 2010

References

External links
 
 Google Finance Profile of Rhodia

Chemical companies of France
Rare earth companies